Langra is one of the 51 union councils of Abbottabad District in the Khyber Pakhtunkhwa province of Pakistan.

Location 

Langra is located at 34°4'0N 73°10'0E and has an average elevation of 871 metres (2860 feet). It is situated to the south of Abbottabad city, neighbouring Union councils are, Salhad - which lies to the North and forms the approach to Abbottabad city, Rajoya to the east, Havelian to the South and Kokal to the west (which forms the approach to Haripur District).

Subdivisions
The Union Council is subdivided into the following areas: Banda Sahib Khan, Lari and Langra. Jadoons are the main tribe with good number of Gujars, Malik Awans, Tanolis and others.

Popular Personalities
 Nisar Khan Jadoon - Founder of Lahore Hazara Goods, and leader of the area

References

Union councils of Abbottabad District

fr:Langra